Music in the Blood is a 1955 West German musical film directed by Erik Ode and starring Viktor de Kowa, Nadia Gray and Waltraut Haas. It portrays the life of the musician Kurt Widmann.

It was shot at the Wandsbek Studios in Hamburg and on location in Amsterdam and Berlin. The film's sets were designed by the art director Albrecht Becker and Herbert Kirchhoff.

Cast
 Viktor de Kowa as Kurt Widmann
 Nadia Gray as Gina Martelli
 Waltraut Haas as Angelika Jäger
 Walter Gross as Angelika
 Ruth Stephan as Irma Pehlke
 Loni Heuser as Cilly Mainsburg
 Heidi Ewert as Häschen
 Gitta Lind as Singer
 Bill Ramsey as Singer
 Edward Tierney as John Miller

References

Bibliography 
 Bock, Hans-Michael & Bergfelder, Tim. The Concise CineGraph. Encyclopedia of German Cinema. Berghahn Books, 2009.

External links 
 

1955 films
1955 musical films
1950s biographical films
German musical films
German biographical films
West German films
1950s German-language films
Films directed by Erik Ode
Biographical films about musicians
Jazz films
Films shot at Wandsbek Studios
Films shot in Berlin
Films shot in Amsterdam
German black-and-white films
1950s German films